Heart That's Pounding is an album by Sally Seltmann, released on 6 April 2010.

Reception

Critics have described the album as "buoyant at every turn, relishing layered whimsy as well as inventive details. Vocal harmonies are everywhere, and a wealth of synth and piano sounds distinguish each song".

Track listing
 "Harmony to My Heartbeat" – 3:55
 "Set Me Free" – 3:35
 "On the Borderline" – 4:01
 "Book Song" – 3:21
 "Dream About Changing" – 3:29
 "Heart That's Pounding" – 3:28
 "I Tossed a Coin" – 3:17
 "Happy" – 3:15
 "The Truth" – 3:30
 "Sentimental Seeker" – 2:39
 "5 Stars" – 3:01
 "Dark Blue Angel" – 3:08

Charts

References

Heart That's Pounding
Arts & Crafts Productions albums
Sally Seltmann albums